Consolidated Nuclear Security is an American federal contractor. They are one of the 100 largest federal contractors in the United States.

Overview
Consolidated Nuclear Security manages the Y-12 National Security Complex and the Pantex plant.

Consolidated Nuclear Security is owned by its member companies Bechtel, Leidos, ATK Launch Systems, Lockheed Martin Services, Inc., SOC LLC. Booz Allen Hamilton is a teaming subcontractor.

History
Early in the 2010s the Department of Energy issued a tender for the combined management of the Y-12 and Pantex facilities on a ten-year contract. CNS won this contract and began management of the two facilities in 2014. The contract was worth approximately $2 billion a year.

In 2020, the Department of Energy announced that they would not be exercising the additional options in Consolidated Nuclear Security's contract which was set to expire on Sept. 30, 2021 three years before the end of the ten-year contract. The Department of Energy terminated the contract for failing to meet performance standards. The situation was made trickier because Bechtel is building the Uranium Processing Facility at Y-12 as a subcontractor to CNS. The primary issues that led to the contract cancellation were repeated failures to meet safety and security standards, with criticality safety and cyber security, being particular concerns.

See also 
 Oak Ridge, Tennessee

References

Defense companies of the United States